Park Woo-Hyun (born April 28, 1980) is a South Korean football player who last played for Gangwon FC.

Career statistics

References

1980 births
Living people
South Korean footballers
People from Sokcho
K League 1 players
Seongnam FC players
Busan IPark players
Gangwon FC players
Association football defenders
Sportspeople from Gangwon Province, South Korea